Steven Wayne Long (born April 14, 1994) is an American politician. He is a member of the South Carolina House of Representatives from the 37th District, serving since 2016. He is a member of the Republican party.

Long is a member of the South Carolina Freedom Caucus.  He also serves on the House Labor, Commerce and Industry Committee.

In 2023, Long was one of 21 Republican co-sponsors of the South Carolina Prenatal Equal Protection Act of 2023, which would make women who had abortions eligible for the death penalty.

References

Living people
1994 births
Republican Party members of the South Carolina House of Representatives
21st-century American politicians
University of South Carolina Upstate alumni